Archduke Ernst of Austria (Ernst Karl Felix Maria Rainer Gottfried Cyriak), Archduke of Austria, Prince Royal of Hungary and Bohemia (August 8, 1824, Milan – April 4, 1899, Arco) was a member of the House of Habsburg-Lorraine.

Early life
Ernst was the second son of the viceroy Archduke Rainer Joseph of Austria and Princess Elisabeth of Savoy. In 1844 was made a Knight of the Order of the Golden Fleece by Emperor Ferdinand I of Austria.

Military career
Ernst started his military career in the garrison of Milan, and in 1845 was appointed colonel and the commander of the 48th Infantry Regiment. In 1847, he was promoted to major general. In 1848, Ernst participated in the events of the 1848 revolution in Milan, when the Austrian troops had to withdraw from the city. In 1849, Ernst was sent with his regiment to Tuscany and managed to conquer Livorno and for a short time to disperse the troops of Giuseppe Garibaldi. For these activities he was in 1850 awarded the Military Merit Cross and promoted to the rank of Feldmarschall-Leutnant.

In the 1850s, Ernst was stationed in Pressburg, and since 1858 in Budapest, where he was appointed a commander of the cavalry corps. In 1866, he participated in military action in Bohemia.

In 1867, Ernst was appointed General of the Cavalry, and in 1868 he retired.

Marriage and children
Ernst claimed that he married the Hungarian noble lady Laura Skublics de Velike et Bessenyö (July 6, 1826, Schloss Bessenyö - October, 18, 1865, Vienna) on April 26th of 1858 in Laibach. She was the daughter of the nobleman Aloysius Skublics de Velike et Besenyő (1791-1835), Prothonotary of the County of Zala, and Barbara Skublics de Velike et Besenyő, née Ivánkovich de Köbölkút (1791-1835). The Emperor Franz Joseph I of Austria had refused to give permission for the morganatic marriage. Nevertheless, the couple treated their union as a marriage and Laura was known as Baroness von Wallburg and their four children who were baptised with the surname 'von Wallburg'. But there was no granting of that title.
 Laura von Wallburg (January 17, 1859, Vienna - died after 1911)
 Ernst Heinrich Karl von Wallburg (January 17, 1859, Vienna - February 16, 1920, Budapest), married with children
 Heinrich von Wallburg (June 27, 1861, Vienna - February 2, 1888, Krems)
 Clothilde von Wallburg (August 12, 1863, Laibach - July 1, 1953, Trieste); married

After the death of the Archduke, the Wallburg children tried to claim part of the estate of the late Archduke in the courts. However, the case collapsed as the marriage certificated presented turned out to be a forgery.  In 1908 Franz Joseph ordered that the baptismal records of the children be altered, and that the children be given the surname of their mother Skublics on the grounds that no marriage had ever taken place.

Orders and decorations
 :
 Knight of the Order of the Golden Fleece, 1844
 Grand Cross of the Austrian Imperial Order of Leopold, with War Decoration, 1849
 Military Merit Cross, with War Decoration
 :
 Knight of the Imperial Order of Saint Andrew the Apostle the First-called
 Knight of the Imperial Order of Saint Alexander Nevsky
 Knight of the Imperial Order of the White Eagle
 Knight of the Imperial Order of Saint Anna, 1st Class
  Kingdom of Prussia:
 Knight of the Order of the Black Eagle, 4 June 1853
 Knight of the Order of the Red Eagle, 1st Class
 : Knight of the Supreme Order of the Most Holy Annunciation
  Holy See: Grand Cross of the Pontifical Equestrian Order of Saint Gregory the Great
  Kingdom of Greece: Grand Cross of the Order of the Redeemer
 : Grand Cross of the Order of Saint-Charles

Ancestry

References

Further reading
Willis, Daniel A. The Archduke's Secret Family. Bygone Era Books, 2011. .

1824 births
1899 deaths
House of Habsburg-Lorraine
Austrian princes
Knights of the Golden Fleece of Austria
Grand Crosses of the Order of Saint-Charles
Knights Grand Cross of the Order of St Gregory the Great
Recipients of the Order of the White Eagle (Russia)
Recipients of the Order of St. Anna, 1st class
Burials at the Imperial Crypt